Ember days are quarterly periods of prayer and fasting in the liturgical calendar of Western Christian churches. These fasts traditionally take place on the Wednesday, Friday, and Saturday following St Lucy's Day (13 December), the first Sunday in Lent, Pentecost (Whitsun), and Holy Cross Day (14 September), though some areas follow a different pattern. Ordination ceremonies are often held on Ember Saturdays or the following Sunday.

Etymology
The word ember originates from the Latin  (literally 'four times').

There are various views as to etymology. According to John Mason Neale in Essays of Liturgiology (1863), Chapter X:

Neil and Willoughby in The Tutorial Prayer Book (1913) prefer the view that it derives from the Anglo-Saxon ymbren, a circuit or revolution (from ymb, around, and ryne, a course, running), clearly relating to the annual cycle of the year. The word occurs in such Anglo-Saxon compounds as ymbren-tid ("Embertide"), ymbren-wucan ("Ember weeks"), ymbren-fisstan ("Ember fasts"), ymbren-dagas ("Ember days").  The word imbren occurs in the acts of the "Council of Ænham" (1009): jejunia quatuor tempora quae imbren vocant, "the fasts of the four seasons which are called "imbren'".

Origins
The term Ember days refers to three days set apart for fasting, abstinence, and prayer during each of the four seasons of the year. The purpose of their introduction was to thank God for the gifts of nature, to teach men to make use of them in moderation, and to assist the needy.

Possibly occasioned by the agricultural feasts of ancient Rome, they came to be observed by Christians for the sanctification of the different seasons of the year. James G. Sabak argues that the Embertide vigils were "...not based on imitating agrarian models of pre-Christian Roman practices, but rather on an eschatological rendering of the year punctuated by the solstices and equinoxes, and thus underscores the eschatological significance of all liturgical vigils in the city of Rome."

At first, the Church in Rome had fasts in June, September, and December. The Liber Pontificalis ascribes to Pope Callixtus I (217–222) a law regulating the fast, although Leo the Great (440–461) considers it an Apostolic institution. When the fourth season was added cannot be ascertained, but Pope Gelasius I (492–496) speaks of all four. The earliest mention of four seasonal fasts is known from the writings of Philastrius, bishop of Brescia (died ca 387) (De haeres. 119). He also connects them with the great Christian festivals.

As the Ember Days came to be associated with great feast days, they later lost their connection to agriculture and came to be regarded solely as days of penitence and prayer. It is only the Michaelmas Embertide, which falls around the autumn harvest, that retains any connection to the original purpose.

The Christian observance of the seasonal Ember days had its origin as an ecclesiastical ordinance in Rome and spread from there to the rest of the Western Church. They were known as the jejunium vernum, aestivum, autumnale and hiernale, so that to quote Pope Leo's words (A.D. 440 - 461) the law of abstinence might apply to every season of the year. In Leo's time, Wednesday, Friday and Saturday were already days of special observance. In order to tie them to the fasts preparatory to the three great festivals of Christmas, Easter and Pentecost, a fourth needed to be added "for the sake of symmetry" as the Encyclopædia Britannica 1911 has it.

From Rome the Ember days gradually spread unevenly through the whole of Western Christendom. In Gaul they do not seem to have been generally recognized much before the 8th century.

Their observance in Britain, however, was embraced earlier than in Gaul or Spain, and Christian sources connect the Ember Days observance with Augustine of Canterbury, AD. 597, said to be acting under the direct authority of Pope Gregory the Great. The precise dates appears to have varied considerably however, and in some cases, quite significantly, the Ember Weeks lost their connection with the Christian festivals altogether. Spain adopted them with the Roman rite in the eleventh century. Charles Borromeo introduced them into Milan in the sixteenth century.

In the Eastern Orthodox Church, ember days have never been observed. Yet in Western Rite Orthodoxy, which is in full communion with the Eastern Orthodox, the Ember days are observed.

Ember Weeks 
The Ember Weeks, the weeks in which the Ember Days occur, are these weeks:
between the third and fourth Sundays of Advent (although the Common Worship lectionary of the Church of England places them in the week following the second Sunday in Advent); but because the calendar reform in the 1970s includes specific "Late Advent" propers for Dec 17 onward, when Divine Worship: The Missal was issued with a particular calendar for the Personal Ordinariates, the Vatican assigned the Ember Days to the first week of Advent.
between the first and second Sundays in Lent;
between Pentecost and Trinity Sunday; and
the liturgical Third Week of September. According to an old way of counting, the first Sunday of a month (a datum important to determine the appropriate Matins readings) was considered the Sunday proximate to, not on or after, the first of the month, so this yielded as Ember Week precisely the week containing the Wednesday after Holy Cross Day (September 14), and as Ember Days said Wednesday and the following Friday and Saturday. It has been preserved in that order by Western Rite Orthodoxy, the Catholic Personal Ordinariates, and Anglicans. For Roman Catholics, a 20th-century reform of the Breviary shifted the First Sunday in September to what the name literally implies, and by implication, Ember Week to the Week beginning with the Sunday after Holy Cross day. Therefore, in a year that September 14 falls on a Sunday, Monday, or Tuesday, the Ember Days for Western Rite Orthodox and Anglicans are a week sooner than for those of most modern-day Catholics. When the Vatican issued the calendar specific to the Personal Ordinariates in Divine Worship: The Missal, it assigned the Ember Days to the traditional, earlier dates.

Timing
The Ordo Romanus fixed the spring fast in the first week of March (then the first month), thus loosely associated with the first Sunday in Lent; the summer fast in the second week of June, after Whitsunday; the autumnal fast in the third week of September following the Exaltation of the Cross, September 14; and the winter fast in the complete week next before Christmas Eve, following St. Lucy's Day (Dec. 13).

These dates are given in the following Latin mnemonic:

Or in an old English rhyme:

"Lenty, Penty, Crucy, Lucy" is a shorter mnemonic for when they fall.

The ember days began on the Wednesday immediately following those days. This meant, for instance, that if September 14 were a Tuesday, the ember days would occur on September 15, 17, and 18. As a result, the ember days in September could fall after either the second or third Sunday in September. This was always the liturgical Third Week of September, since the First Sunday of September was the Sunday closest to September 1 (August 29 to September 4). 

As a simplification of the liturgical calendar, Pope John XXIII modified this so that the Third Sunday was the third Sunday actually within the calendar month. Thus if September 14 were a Sunday, September 24, 26 and 27 would be ember days, the latest dates possible. With September 14 as a Saturday, the ember days would occur on September 18, 20 and 21 - the earliest possible dates.

Other regulations prevailed in different countries, until the inconveniences arising from the want of uniformity led to the rule now observed being laid down under Pope Urban II as the law of the church, at the Council of Piacenza and the Council of Clermont, 1095.

Prior to the reforms instituted after the Second Vatican Council, the Roman Catholic Church mandated fasting (only one full meal per day plus two partial, meatless meals) on all Ember Days (which meant both fasting and abstinence from meat on Ember Fridays), and the faithful were encouraged (though not required) to receive the sacrament of penance whenever possible. On February 17, 1966, Pope Paul VI's decree Paenitemini excluded the Ember Days as days of fast and abstinence for Roman Catholics.

The revision of the liturgical calendar in 1969 laid down the following rules for Ember Days and Rogation days:

They may appear in some calendars as "days of prayer for peace".

They were made optional by churches of the Anglican Communion in 1976.  In the Episcopal Church, the September Ember Days are still (optionally) observed on the Wednesday, Friday, and Saturday after Holy Cross Day, so that if September 14 is a Sunday, Monday, or Tuesday, the Ember Days fall on the following Wednesday, Friday, and Saturday (in the second week of September) whereas they fall a week later (in the third week of September) for the Roman Catholic Church.

Some Lutheran church calendars continue the observation of Ember and Rogation days, though the practice has diminished over the past century.

Ordination of clergy

The rule that ordination of clergy should take place in the Ember weeks was set in documents traditionally associated with Pope Gelasius I (492–496), the pontificate of Archbishop Ecgbert of York, A.D. 732 - 766, and referred to as a canonical rule in a capitulary of Charlemagne. It was finally established as a law of the church in the pontificate of Pope Gregory VII, ca 1085.

However, why Ember Saturdays are traditionally associated with ordinations (other than episcopal ones) is unclear. By the time of at the penultimate Code of Canon Law (1917), major orders could also be conferred on the Saturday preceding Passion Sunday, and on the Easter Vigil; for grave reasons, on Sundays and holy days of obligation; and, for minor orders, even without grave reason, on all Sundays and double feasts, which included most saints' feasts and thus the great majority of the calendar. 

Present Roman Catholic canon law (1983) prefers them to be conferred on Sundays and holy days of obligation, but allows them for pastoral reason on any day. In practice the use of Saturdays, though not necessarily Ember Saturdays, still prevails. Subsequently, Pentecost Vigil and the feast of Sts. Peter and Paul (and Saturdays around it) have come much in use as ordination days.

Weather prediction

In the folk meteorology of the North of Spain, the weather of the ember days (témporas) is considered to predict the weather of the rest of the year.
The prediction methods differ in the regions.
Two frequent ones are:
 Wind-based: The season after the ember days will have as a prevailing wind the prevailing one during the ember days (some just consider the wind at midnight). That wind usually has an associated weather. Hence, if the southern wind brings dry air and clear skies, a southern wind during the winter embers forecasts a dry winter.
 Considering each day separately: The Wednesday weather predicts the weather for the first month; the Friday weather for the second month and the Saturday weather for the third month.

Other parts of the Hispanic world derive predictions from the cabañuelas days.

See also
 Rogation days
 Perchta (Quatemberca, Kvaternica, Lady of the Ember Days)
 Quarter days
 Cross-quarter day
 Tempura: A Japanese dish possibly derived from ember-day fasting practices

Notes

References

Sources

External links

Readings and Litanies for the Ember Days
Medieval Sourcebook: The Golden Legend: Ember Days
William Smith, D.C.L., LL.D, A Dictionary of Greek and Roman Antiquities, John Murray, London, 1875. Contains a description of Roman feriae.
 "Ember Days", The Old Farmer's Almanac

Weather prediction
 , interview with :eu:Pello Zabala, folk meteorologist.
  

Asceticism
Catholic holy days
Catholic liturgy
Catholic penitential practices
Quarter days
Traditionalist Catholicism
Weather lore
Spanish folklore